Bossom is a surname. Notable people with the surname include:

Alfred Bossom, Baron Bossom FRIBA (1881–1965), English architect active in the United States
Clive Bossom FRSA, FRGS (1918–2017), British Conservative Party politician and Member of Parliament
Bossom baronets, of Maidstone in the County of Kent, a title in the Baronetage of the United Kingdom